Eucalyptus doratoxylon, commonly known as the spearwood mallee, spearwood or geitch-gmunt in Noongar language is a species of mallee that is endemic to Western Australia. It has smooth, powdery white bark, lance-shaped to curved adult leaves mostly arranged in opposite pairs, flower buds in groups of seven, white to pale yellow flowers and pendulous, more or less spherical fruit.

Description
It has smooth, powdery white over reddish or greenish bark. Flowering occurs between August and March and the flowers are white to pale yellow.

Taxonomy
Eucalyptus doratoxylon was first formally described in 1860 by the botanist Ferdinand von Mueller in Fragmenta Phytographiae Australiae from samples collected by George Maxwell in the Kojoneerup district.
The specific epithet is (doratoxylon) is derived from the Ancient Greek words dory, doratos meaning "spear" and xylon meaning "wood", possibly in reference to the use of the stems for spears.

Distribution
Spearwood mallee grows in sandy loam or white-grey sandy soils in heath and open forest on hills and around granite outcrops along the south coast in the Esperance Plains, Jarrah Forest and Mallee biogeographic regions of Western Australia.

Conservation status
Eucalyptus doratoxylon is classified as "not threatened" by the Western Australian Government Department of Parks and Wildlife

Noongar Uses
Noongars used the branches to make spears: the bends in the branch were straightened over fire and the tips were sharpened using a chert flake.

As with all other Eucalypts in the south-western region of Western Australia, the leaves of this species were crushed to make antibacterial poultices for wounds. They were also crushed and steamed to relieve nasal congestion. The gum was used after grinding, to make an ointment for sores, and also taken orally as a treatment for dysentery.

See also

List of Eucalyptus species

References

Eucalypts of Western Australia
Trees of Australia
doratoxylon
Myrtales of Australia
Plants described in 1880
Taxa named by Ferdinand von Mueller
Mallees (habit)